Marshall King (born: 15 April 1966) is a sailor from Ireland, who represented his country at the 1996 Summer Olympics in Savannah, United States as helmsman in the Soling. With crew members Garrett Connolly and Dan O'Grady they took the 16th place.

References

1966 births
Living people
Sailors at the 1996 Summer Olympics – Soling
Olympic sailors of Ireland
Irish male sailors (sport)